Egge is a Norwegian surname. The surname is often confused with the surname Edge Notable people with the surname include:

Ana Egge (born 1976), American folk singer/songwriter
Bjørn Egge (1918–2007), resistance fighter and major general in the Norwegian Defence Force 
Ketil Egge (1950–1997), Norwegian actor and theatre director
Klaus Egge (1906–1979), Norwegian composer and music critic
Peter Egge (1869–1959), Norwegian writer
Ørnulf Egge (1910–1978), Norwegian politician

Norwegian-language surnames